Saint Mochoemoc (or Pulcherius,, c. 550–656) was an early Irish abbot, later considered to have been a saint.
He was a nephew of Saint Íte of Killeedy, who raised him. He became a monk in Bangor Abbey under the abbot Saint Comgall of Bangor. 
He was the founding abbot of Liath-Mochoemoc (Liathmore) monastery.
His feast day is 13 March.

Life

Saint Mochoemoc or Pulcherius was born about 550 AD.
His parents were a craftsman named Beoanus and Nesse, sister of Saint Íte of Killeedy.
His father was born in Connemara in Connaught, and settled in Hui Conaill Gabhra in the south of County Limerick near Killeedy, where Saint Ita lived.
It is said that Saint Fachtna of Ross Ailither was cured of an affection of his eyes by bathing them in the milk of Mochaemog's mother.
He was brought up by Saint Ite, then at the age of 20 was sent to  Bangor Abbey where he was further instructed by the abbot Saint Comgall of Bangor.

Mochoemoc was sent out by Comgall as a missionary accompanied by the saints Laichtin, Molua Mac Ochai (a Findbarr) and Luchtigern.
He built cells for his monks at Anatrim.
He reached southern Éile in County Tipperary, where a chieftain granted him a site for a monastery in the forest near Lake Lurgan, since known as Liathmochaemog (Liathmore) in the parish of Two-Mile Borris, Barony of Eliogarty.
He quarrelled with Faílbe Flann mac Áedo Duib, king of Munster (619-634), but all the saints of Ireland appeared to the king in visions and forced him to treat Mochaemog with respect.
Failbhe was succeeded by Ronan, son of Bledin, who was hostile to Mochaemog but renewed his grant.

Saint Dagán was brought to the school of Machoemoc at Liathmore when he was very young.
There is a legend that while Dagán was still a boy, some raiders from Osraige killed him.
His decapitated body and his head were taken to Pulcherius, who had promised to give the boy Holy Communion before he died.
Saint Cainnech of Aghaboe, who was present, placed the head in its position on the body and prayed to Christ, who restored life to Dagán.
Pulcherius gave him Holy Communion, and Dagán lived for many more years as head of a large monastery in Inverdaoile.
Dagan of Inverdaoile was known as a violent opponent of the Roman Easter.

There is a story that the saints Pulcherius, Canice, Molua and Mofecta or Feachtna visited a monk named Mochumb at the church of Tifeachna
The saints stayed there for a while, then before leaving each placed a stone, one above the other, to commemorate the visit.
John Francis Shearman (1879) wrote that "Thirty years ago there was at Tifeachna, on the western side of the churchyard, a pyramidical-shaped monument, built of small truncated codes, placed loosely one on top of the other, they are probably the memorials ferrred to in the aforesaid chapter."

Pulcherius was said to have lived to a great age, and died in Liathmore on 13 of March 656.
There is a church named after Mochaemog in the Barony of Ida, County Kilkenny.

Birth: Colgan's account

John Colgan in his Acta Sanctorum Hiberniae (1645) gives an account of the birth of Pulcherius,

Butler's account

According to the hagiographer Alban Butler in  The Lives of the Irish Saints (1823),

Monks of Ramsgate account

The Monks of Ramsgate wrote in their Book of Saints (1921),

Walsh and Conyngham account

Thomas Walsh and David Power Conyngham give a more extensive account in their Ecclesiastical History of Ireland (1885).

Notes

Citations

Sources

  

 
 

 

 

Medieval saints of Munster
550 births
656 deaths